The 1996 IGA Tennis Classic was a women's tennis tournament played on indoor hard courts at The Greens Country Club in Oklahoma City, OK. It was part of Tier III of the 1996 WTA Tour. It was the 11th edition of the tournament and was held from February 20 through February 25, 1996. Second-seeded Brenda Schultz-McCarthy won the singles title.

Finals

Singles

 Brenda Schultz-McCarthy defeated  Amanda Coetzer 6–3, 6–2
 It was Schultz-McCarthy's 1st title of the year and the 10th of her career.

Doubles

 Chanda Rubin /  Brenda Schultz-McCarthy defeated  Katrina Adams /  Debbie Graham 6–4, 6–3
 It was Rubin's 2nd title of the year and the 5th of her career. It was Schultz-McCarthy's 2nd title of the year and the 11th of her career.

References

External links
 ITF tournament edition details
 Tournament draws

IGA Classic
U.S. National Indoor Championships
IGA Tennis Classic
IGA Tennis Classic
IGA Tennis Classic